Qeshlaq-e Valiollah (also Romanized as Qeshlāq-e Valīollāh and Qeshlāq Valīollah) is a village in Khezel-e Sharqi Rural District, Khezel District, Nahavand County, Hamadan Province, Iran. At the 2006 census, its population was 85, in 19 families.

References 

Populated places in Nahavand County